Epsilon Eta, also known as Ep Eta, is an American professional gender-inclusive fraternity for students interested in careers in environmental science and  sustainability. Founded in 2006 at the University of North Carolina at Chapel Hill, it is the first nationwide environmental fraternity in the United States. The fraternity has grown to include chapters across the United States.

History 
Liza Schillo, an undergraduate student at the University of North Carolina at Chapel Hill, founded Epsilon Eta Environmental Honors Fraternity in 2006. It was established as a professional, gender-inclusive fraternity for individuals seeking post-graduate positions in the environmental field. The fraternity's mission is "to promote a healthy and sustainable environment and connect students to industries, community service, and academia in pursuit of these goals." Epsilon Eta has three pillars: academics, community, and service.

Beta chapter at the University of Michigan was conceived by Julia Austin, Zach Fogel, Daly Kleaveland, and Julia Wang in the summer of  2014. They recruited Caitlin Climes, Sam McMulle, Josh Musicant, Dylan Nelson, and  Matt Sehrsweeney to complete the group of nine founders. Beta chapter was chartered and initiated its first class in 2015.

Originally meeting in a freshman environmental earth sciences seminar, nine sophomores formed a  Epsilon Eta colony at the University of Pennsylvania in the October 2015; the colony later became Gamma chapter. Other chapters followed in 2016 and 2017, with North Carolina State University becoming the seventh official chapter in 2017. The twelfth  chapter was established at the University of Delaware in 2018. This was followed by chapters at the University of Illinois Urbana-Champaign and San Diego State University in 2018, and Boston University and University of Maryland, College Park in 2019.  

By 2000, the Alpha chapter had initiated ninety members and an executive committee was established to oversee the national fraternity. However, in the fall of 2020 three of Alpha chapter's former members publicly criticized the group "for fostering white supremacy." The fraternity's executive board and Alpha's members decided to close the chapter in September 2020. The Daily Tar Heel shared the chapter's statement: "As a historically exclusive and majority-white institution with semblances of Greek life, we have contributed to the preservation of white supremacy on UNC-Chapel Hill’s campus. Our actions have marginalized and silenced BIPOC voices. To address these injustices, we view abolition as the most direct course of action to dismantle white supremacy." 

Despite this setback, new chapters formed at Virginia Commonwealth University in 2020, the University of Arizona in 2022, and the University of Virginia in 2023. The Alpha chapter was reestablished at the University of North Carolina in September 2022 by Tayton Alvis, Sarah Masters, Zachary Miller, Gregory Mink, and Sanjana Venkatraman.

Symbols 
The Greek letters Epsilon Eta stand for Science and Morality. Epsilon Eta's colors are Kelly green, Navy blue, and Sky blue. Its original emblem is a sky-blue shield edged in navy blue and decorated with a white three-pronged geometric knot entwined around an oak tree. A later variation of the emblem features a light green shield with a dark green emblem of leaf veins on the right half and an overlaying tree in dark green across the center.

Membership 
Membership to Epsilon Eta is not limited by major but initiates must be interested in the environmental field. The fraternity's members are divided into regular, associate, and alumni. Associate members are undergraduates who fail to meet the GPA or service hour requirements. Regular members and alumni may wear the fraternity's insignia.

Chapters 
Following are the collegiate chapters of Epsilon Eta. Active chapters are indicated in bold. Inactive chapters are indicated in italic.

Notes

See also 
 Professional fraternities and sororities

References 

Student organizations established in 2006
2006 establishments in North Carolina
Professional fraternities and sororities in the United States
Honor societies
Environmental science
University of North Carolina at Chapel Hill
Student societies in the United States